Shah Mansuri (also Romanized as Shāh Manşūrī and Shah Mansoori) is a village in Howmeh Rural District, in the Central District of Minab County, Hormozgan Province, Iran. At the 2006 census, its population was 733, in 150 families.

References 

Populated places in Minab County